Michel Brusseaux (19 March 1913 – 28 February 1986) was a professional French association footballer. He was born in Oran.

References

External links
 
 Michel Brusseaux at Weltfussball.de  
 

1913 births
1986 deaths
French footballers
France international footballers
Ligue 1 players
OGC Nice players
FC Sète 34 players
AS Saint-Étienne players
1938 FIFA World Cup players
French football managers
AC Ajaccio managers
Footballers from Oran
Pieds-Noirs
Association football forwards